Antonio Anastasio Rossi (18 July 1864 – 29 March 1948) was an Italian Roman Catholic prelate. 

Rossi was Archbishop of Udine from 8 January 1910 to 1927. On 19 December 1927, was appointed Prelate of Pompei and Latin Patriarch of Constantinople, and served in those roles until his death in 1948. In the 1930s, as prelate he expanded the Shrine of the Virgin of the Rosary of Pompei to accommodate the increasing number of pilgrims, and increased its social outreach among the poor and orphans. He was the last Latin Patriarch of Constantinople: the titular see was suppressed in 1964 without a successor being appointed.

Rossi died on 29 March 1948, aged 83, and is entombed in the crypt of the Shrine of the Virgin of the Rosary of Pompei.

See also

References

Bibliography
 

1864 births
1948 deaths
Italian Roman Catholic archbishops
Bishops in Friuli-Venezia Giulia
Territorial prelates
Latin Patriarchs of Constantinople